Arthur Charles Harrison (8 February 1893 – 3 May 1917) was an Australian rules footballer who played for the Richmond Football Club and Fitzroy Football Club in the Victorian Football League. He played in Fitzroy's 1913 premiership side after two players were ruled out due to injury and suspension respectively. He was killed at Bullecourt in World War I.

See also
 List of Victorian Football League players who died on active service

Sources
Holmesby, Russell & Main, Jim (2007). The Encyclopedia of AFL Footballers. 7th ed. Melbourne: Bas Publishing.

1893 births
1917 deaths
Australian rules footballers from Victoria (Australia)
Fitzroy Football Club players
Fitzroy Football Club Premiership players
Richmond Football Club players
Australian military personnel killed in World War I
One-time VFL/AFL Premiership players